The Orléans Madonna is a c.1506-1507 painting of the Madonna and Child by Raphael. It was acquired by Philippe II, Duke of Orléans for the Orléans collection, giving it its present name. It is now in the Musée Condé in Chantilly.

History
Copies of the work are mentioned in Piedmont in the early 16th century and the Piedmont-born painter Giovanni Martino Spanzotti mentioned it as a "tabuleto fiorentino" in a 1507 letter to Charles II of Savoy. Several other studio copies of the painting were made between 1507 and 1526, four of which are still known to survive, including one at the Rijksmuseum in Amsterdam and one in the Walters Art Museum in Baltimore, USA.

The original work remained in the collection of the Dukes of Savoy until the 17th century. Christine of France bought four Raphael paintings in 1647, probably including this one. The work then vanishes until 1729, when it is mentioned in the Recueil d'estampes commissioned by Pierre Crozat as belonging to a man called Passart then passing to abbé François de Camps (1643-1723), scholar and bishop of Pamiers, and finally to Philippe d'Orléans (1674-1723). It was then kept in the Palais-Royal until the French Revolution.

In 1791 Philippe Égalité sold his whole collection of Italian paintings to his banker Édouard de Walkiers to cover his colossal debts. de Walkiers resold the collection to his cousin François Laborde de Méreville. In 1798, the whole collection was sold in London to Lords Bridgewater, Gower and Carlyle, though they then resold the Madonna, which was then acquired by the collectors Hibbert in London in 1799, Nieuwenhuys in 1831 in Brussels and Delamarre or de Lahaute in Paris. Next it was acquired by marquis Aguado in 1835 and finally by the businessman and parliamentarian François Delessert (1780-1868). Delessert's collection was sold a year after his death and the Madonna was acquired by Henri d'Orleans, Duke of Aumale, who hung it in the 'Santuario' of his château de Chantilly, alongside Three Graces and a panel by Filippino Lippi.

See also
List of paintings by Raphael
:fr:La Madone d'Orléans

Notes

References

External links

1507 paintings
Paintings of the Madonna and Child by Raphael
Paintings in the collection of the Musée Condé
Paintings formerly in the Orleans Collection